Luo Yang (1961November 25, 2012) was a Chinese aircraft designer. He was the head of production and designer for the Shenyang J-15 fighter jet. He was also the chairman and general manager of Shenyang Aircraft Corporation.

Career
In 1982, after graduating from Beihang University with a bachelor's degree, where he studied high-altitude equipment, Luo Yang joined the Shenyang Aircraft Design Institute. After some time there, he was promoted to deputy director of the institute.

Death
On November 25, 2012, Luo suffered a sudden heart attack and subsequently died in hospital. Luo was under pressure to make the J-15 fighter jet land on aircraft carrier Liaoning successfully. A memorial service for him was held in Shenyang, his birthplace.

References

1961 births
2012 deaths

zh:罗阳 (董事长)